The Billings ovulation method is a method in which women use their vaginal mucus to determine their fertility. It does not rely on the presence of ovulation, rather it identifies patterns of potential fertility and obvious infertility within the cycle, whatever its length. Effectiveness, however, is not very clear.

Evidence 
Evidence of effectiveness is not very clear. Typical use of this method is associated with a pregnancy rate of 1 to 22%. A World Health Organization study found that 15% is caused by a conscious departure from method rules. The percentage of people who stop using the method after a year is between 1 and 24%. Perfect use has been estimated to result in pregnancy in 0.5 to 3%. Some studies of perfect use excluded those who could not detect secretions that represented fertility.

Fertility

A woman ovulates at only one time during her cycle, and an unfertilised ovum can survive for only 12–24 hours.
Cervical mucus enabling healthy sperm cells to navigate the genital tract is necessary for fertility.
Most commonly, spermatozoa live only one to three days in the presence of fertile mucus, with survival up to five days being rare.  The possibility of pregnancy from sperm survival longer than five days has been compared to "the chances of winning a huge lottery."  
Menstruation will occur about 2 weeks after ovulation.
A ten-year study of 45,280 subfertile couples in China found that 32.1% of women were able to achieve pregnancy and live birth through the use of Billings.

Function
In the days leading up to ovulation the cervix responds to oestrogen by producing mucus capable of sustaining sperm survival. This mucus leaves the vagina as the woman is in an upright position. The mucus is observed through the sensation at the vulva and by looking at any cervical secretions. Daily charting of these observations will reveal either an unchanging pattern indicating infertility or a changing pattern of sensation and discharge indicating fertility. Both of these patterns follow the hormonal patterns which control sperm survival and conception.

History
The first recorded observations of the relationship between cervical mucus and survival of spermatozoa come from the mid-19th century. The topic was not systematically studied, however, for almost another century. In 1948, Erik Odeblad was studying mycoplasms in the female genital tract. During the course of his studies, he noticed that cervical mucus changed in a predictable pattern through the course of a woman's cycle. He continued his study of the cervix.

John Billings (1918–2007) was involved with the development of the Billings ovulation method.

References

External links
http://billings.life/ Official site] of the Billings Ovulation Method
http://www.jabfm.org/content/29/4/508.full.pdf+html The Performance of Fertility Awareness-based Method Apps Marketed to Avoid Pregnancy
https://billingsmentor.org/fabmApps.pdf Fertility Awareness-based Method Apps for the Billings Method

Fertility awareness